The Stal-11 (Stal – steel) was a high speed transport aircraft / reconnaissance aircraft designed and built in the USSR from 1933.

Development 
The Stal-11 was intended to carry four passengers with mail and baggage as well as fulfil a military reconnaissance role.  The Stal-11 was constructed using an Enerzh-6 stainless steel built-up truss covered with Delta-wood for the fuselage, and an all-wood wing with built-up ribs. Two spars and very smooth skinning completed the structure. The prototype was completed in the Autumn of 1936, flight trials commencing shortly after, with wheels and skis. Results of the approximately 300 flight tests were promising but the aircraft was expensive to build, with high running costs so no production was authorised.

Specifications (Stal-11

See also

References

 Gunston, Bill. “The Osprey Encyclopaedia of Russian Aircraft 1875–1995”. London, Osprey. 1995. 

1930s Soviet airliners
1930s Soviet military reconnaissance aircraft
Aircraft manufactured in the Soviet Union
Abandoned military aircraft projects of the Soviet Union
Aircraft first flown in 1936
OOS aircraft
Single-engined tractor aircraft